The Calgary Distinguished Writers Program at the University of Calgary strives to advance the careers of Canadian writers, invigorate the Calgary writing community, and enhance the activities of the Faculty of Arts and the Department of English. The Program achieves its objectives through two annual residency programs: one for an emerging Canadian writer, and one for a distinguished writer of international stature.

While in Calgary, these writers divide their time between writing and community activities. Community activities include individual manuscript consultations and providing advice to local writers, conducting writing workshops, giving public readings, and meeting with school groups.

History

The University of Calgary's Faculty of Arts established the Calgary Distinguished Writers Program in 1993 with a generous donation from a private donor. Since its inception in 1993, the program has brought to Calgary two Nobel Laureates, Derek Walcott and Wole Soyinka, and such literary luminaries as Neil Gaiman, Margaret Atwood, Art Spiegelman, Billy Collins, Timothy Findley, Thomas King, Ursula K. Le Guin, Alberto Manguel, and Michael Ondaatje, among others.

Complete List of Writers-In-Residence

2019–2020
Sharanpal Ruprai

2018–2019
Liz Howard

2017–2018
Denise Chong

2016–2017
Shane Book

2015–2016
Nick Thran

2014—2015
Ian Williams

2013—2014
Sara Tilley

2012—2013
Deborah Willis

2011—2012
Jeramy Dodds

2010—2011
Oana Avasilichioaei

2009—2010
Marcello Di Cintio

2008—2009
Charlotte Gill

2007—2008
Sina Queyras

2006—2007
Jaspreet Singh

2005—2006
Melanie Little

2004—2005
Natalee Caple

2003—2004
Robert Finley

2002—2003
Suzette Mayr

2001—2002
Eden Robinson
              	
2000—2001
Laura Robinson

1999—2000
Richard Sanger

1998—1999
Peter Oliva

1997—1998
Larissa Lai	

1996—1997
Rosemary Nixon

1995–1996
Richard Harrison

1994—1995
Ven Begamudré

1993—1994
Roberta Rees

Complete List of Distinguished Visiting Writers

2018–2019
Amitav Ghosh

2017–2018
Marlon James

2016–2017
Michael Chabon

2015–2016
Zadie Smith

2014—2015
Shyam Selvadurai, Evelyn Lau

2013—2014
Neil Gaiman, Alberto Manguel

2012—2013
Margaret Atwood

2011—2012
Billy Collins

2010—2011
Art Spiegelman

2009—2010
Margaret MacMillan

2008—2009
Alberto Rios

2007—2008
Daphne Marlatt, Derek Walcott

2006—2007
Frederick Busch Tribute

2005—2006
Rudy Wiebe, Oliver Sacks

2004—2005
Alistair MacLeod

2003—2004
Anita Rau Badami, Dionne Brand, Louis de Bernières

2002—2003	
Robert Kroetsch, Wole Soyinka

2001—2002
Nicole Brossard, Timothy Findley

2000—2001
Gary Burns,
Deepa Mehta,
Erín Moure,
Paul Quarrington,
Anne Wheeler

1999—2000
Emma Donoghue,
Tony Kushner

1998—1999
Dionne Brand,
Louise Halfe,
Alberto Manguel,
Adrienne Rich

1997—1998
Anita Rau Badami,
Rose Scollard

1996—1997
Louis de Bernières,
Ursula K. Le Guin,
Steve McCaffery,
D.M. Thomas

1995—1996	
Robin Blaser,
Robert Creeley,
Keri Hulme,
Sir Laurens van der Post,
Yevgeny Yevtushenko,
	
1994—1995
David Albahari,
Marilyn Dumont,
Thomas King,
Tom Raworth

1993—1994
Michael Ondaatje

Notes and references

External links
Calgary Distinguished Writers Program

University of Calgary
1993 establishments in Alberta